Sherman Township is one of the nineteen townships of Huron County, Ohio, United States. As of the 2010 census the population of the township was 510.

Geography
Located on the western edge of the county, it borders the following townships:
Lyme Township - north
Ridgefield Township - northeast corner
Peru Township - east
Greenfield Township - southeast corner
Norwich Township - south
Reed Township, Seneca County - southwest
Thompson Township, Seneca County - northwest

No municipalities are located in Sherman Township.

Name and history
Sherman Township was named for Taylor Sherman, a director of the Firelands company.

It is the only Sherman Township statewide.

Government
The township is governed by a three-member board of trustees, who are elected in November of odd-numbered years to a four-year term beginning on the following January 1. Two are elected in the year after the presidential election and one is elected in the year before it. There is also an elected township fiscal officer, who serves a four-year term beginning on April 1 of the year after the election, which is held in November of the year before the presidential election. Vacancies in the fiscal officership or on the board of trustees are filled by the remaining trustees.

References

External links
County website

Townships in Huron County, Ohio
Townships in Ohio